Aleksei Volkov may refer to:

 Aleksei Volkov (politician) (1890–1942), Soviet politician
 Aleksei Andreyevich Volkov (1859–1929), valet at the court of the Russian czar Nicholas II
 Aleksei Yevgenyevich Volkov (born 1991), Russian footballer
 Aleksei Volkov (footballer, born 1998), Russian footballer
 Aleksei Volkov (ice hockey) (born 1980), Russian ice hockey player
 Aleksei Volkov (volleyball), Russian athlete who competed in Sitting volleyball at the 2008 Summer Paralympics
 Aleksey Volkov (rugby union), Russian rugby union international
 Alexey Volkov (biathlete) (b. 1988), Russian biathlete